The 2020 season was Bunyodkors 14th season in the Uzbek League in Uzbekistan.

Season events
On 16 March, all football in Uzbekistan was suspended due to the COVID-19 pandemic in Uzbekistan.

On 13 July, Bunyodkor's away game against FK Buxoro, scheduled for the same day, was postponed due to the Bunyodkor squad taking precautionary measures after conducting COVID-19 tests.

On 20 July, the Uzbekistan Super League was suspended for a second time due to COVID-19 pandemic in Uzbekistan, with it being announced on 24 July that the league would resume on 3 August with the scheduled 10th round matches.

Squad

Out on loan

Transfers

Winter

In:

Out:

Summer

In:

Out:

Friendlies

Competitions

Uzbek League

League table

Results summary

Results by round

Results

Uzbek Cup

AFC Champions League

Qualifying rounds

Squad statistics

Appearances and goals

|-
|colspan="14"|Players away on loan:

|-
|colspan="14"|Players who left Bunyodkor during the season:

|}

Goal scorers

Clean sheets

Disciplinary Record

References

Sport in Tashkent
FC Bunyodkor seasons
Bunyodkor